Terence "Terry" A. Clawson (9 April 1940 – 2 September 2013) was an English World Cup winning professional rugby league footballer who played from the 1950s through to the 1980s. He played at representative level for Great Britain between 1962 and 1974, and was part of the 1972 Rugby League World Cup winning squad. He also played for Yorkshire, and at club level for Featherstone Rovers (Heritage No. 390) (two spells) (captain), Bradford Northern (Heritage No.) He coached at club level for South Newcastle and Featherstone Rovers.

Background
Clawson as born in Normanton, West Riding of Yorkshire, England, he worked as a coal miner both during, and after, his playing career, in 2000, he released an autobiography, entitled All the Wrong Moves, he died aged 73 in Pontefract, West Yorkshire, England.

Playing career

Featherstone Rovers
Clawson started his career at Featherstone Rovers, making his début aged 17 against Bramley on Saturday 28 December 1957. He won his first club trophy in 1959, Terry Clawson played  in Featherstone Rovers' 15–14 victory over Hull F.C. in the 1959–60 Yorkshire County Cup Final during the 1959–60 season at Headingley Rugby Stadium, Leeds on Saturday 31 October 1959. In 1963, it was discovered that Clawson had contracted tuberculosis, threatening to bring his rugby league career to an end. He made a full recovery however, although he missed the majority of the 1963–64 season.

Clawson won caps for Yorkshire while at Featherstone Rovers; during the 1960–61 season against Lancashire, and during the 1962–63 season against Cumberland, and Lancashire.

Bradford Northern
In January 1965, Clawson was transferred to Bradford Northern for a fee believed to be just over £3,000. He appeared in over 130 games for Bradford, scoring more than 500 points.

Terry Clawson played right-, i.e. number 12, and scored 4-goals in Bradford Northern's 17–8 victory over Hunslet in the 1965–66 Yorkshire County Cup Final during the 1965–66 season at Headingley Rugby Stadium, Leeds on Saturday 16 October 1965.

Hull Kingston Rovers
In October 1968, Hull Kingston Rovers signed Clawson in an exchange deal which saw Geoff Wriglesworth and Frank Foster join Bradford Northern. He went to make 111 appearances for the club before joining Leeds in 1971.

Leeds
Clawson played for Leeds in the 1971–72 Challenge Cup Final during the 1971–72 season at Wembley Stadium, but ended up on the losing side in a 13–16 defeat by St. Helens. A week later, he played and scored three conversions in Leeds 9–5 victory over St Helens in the Championship Final during the 1971–72 season at Station Road, Swinton on Saturday 20 May 1972, and was awarded the Harry Sunderland Trophy for his man of the match performance.

Clawson played  left-, i.e. number 8, (replaced by  interchange/substitute Tony Fisher) and scored 5-goals in Leeds' 36–9 victory over Dewsbury in the 1972–73 Yorkshire County Cup Final during the 1972–73 season at Odsal Stadium, Bradford on Saturday 7 October 1972, and played right-, i.e. number 10, in the 7–2 victory over Wakefield Trinity in the 1973–74 Yorkshire County Cup Final during the 1973–74 season at Headingley Rugby Stadium, Leeds on Saturday 20 October 1973.

Clawson played  left-, i.e. number 8, and scored 2-goals in Leeds' 12–7 victory over Salford in the 1972–73 Player's No.6 Trophy Final during the 1972–73 season at Fartown Ground, Huddersfield on Saturday 24 March 1973.

Clawson later joined Oldham.

Later career
Clawson spent 12 months at Oldham before moving on to York. He went to have second spells at Bradford Northern and Featherstone Rovers, and also played for Wakefield Trinity, Huddersfield and Hull FC, where he played his last match in 1980, aged 40.

Australian career
During the 1970s Clawson captained-coached in Australia's Newcastle Rugby League with the Souths club. He was later named in a South Newcastle team of the century in 2010.

International honours
Terry Clawson won caps for Great Britain while at Featherstone Rovers in 1962 against France (2 matches), while at Leeds in the 1972 Rugby League World Cup against Australia, France and Australia, while at Oldham in 1973 against Australia (3 matches), and in 1974 against France (2 matches), Australia (2 matches), and New Zealand (2 matches).

Genealogical information
Terry Clawson is the father of the rugby league footballer who played in the 1980s for Bradford Northern, and is a strength and conditioning coach; Martin Clawson, and the rugby league footballer who played in the 1980s and 1990s for Featherstone Rovers, Oldham and Swinton; Neil Clawson.

References

External links
!Great Britain Statistics at englandrl.co.uk (statistics currently missing due to not having appeared for both Great Britain, and England)
(archived by web.archive.org) Statistics at orl-heritagetrust.org.uk
Photograph "Terry Clawson - Terry Clawson tries to break through the Hull KR defence. - 07/03/1976" at rlhp.co.uk
Photograph "Debutant Clawson -  New signing Terry Clawson back at Odsal for the second time, at Number 8. - 18/01/1976" at rlhp.co.uk
Photograph "Clawson held - Terry Clawson is held by two Featherstone defenders in the snow at Odsal. - 27/02/1977" at rlhp.co.uk
Photograph "Father and son - Terry Clawson measures son Martin up for his shirt on signing for the club." at rlhp.co.uk
(archived by web.archive.org) Kangaroos beat Lions at Wilderspool
RFL leads tributes to Clawson
Former Bradford Northern player Terry Clawson dies
Terry Clawson at marklaspalmas.blogspot.co.uk
(archived by web.archive.org) Leeds mourn death of one of RL’s ‘great characters’
(archived by web.archive.org) Death of former Rovers star Clawson
(archived by web.archive.org) Rugby League mourns World Cup winner Clawson
(archived by web.archive.org) Obituary at announce.jpress.co.uk

1940 births
2013 deaths
Bradford Bulls players
English expatriate sportspeople in Australia
English rugby league coaches
English rugby league players
Featherstone Rovers captains
Featherstone Rovers coaches
Featherstone Rovers players
Great Britain national rugby league team players
Hull F.C. players
Hull Kingston Rovers players
Leeds Rhinos players
Oldham R.L.F.C. players
Rugby league props
Rugby league second-rows
South Newcastle Lions coaches
South Newcastle Lions players
Rugby league players from Wakefield
Wakefield Trinity players
York Wasps players
Yorkshire rugby league team players